Jaén is a province of southern Spain, in the eastern part of the autonomous community of Andalusia. It is bordered by the provinces of Ciudad Real, Albacete, Granada and Córdoba. Its capital is Jaén city.

Its area is 13,484 km². Its population is 657,387 (2003), about one sixth of whom living in the capital. It contains 97 municipalities. The highest point of the province is Pico Mágina (2165 m).

One of the less-known provinces of Spain, compared to the tourist-oriented coast, it has four national parks and many other protected natural areas. The province also contains two Renaissance cities, Úbeda and Baeza, both recently declared World Heritage Sites by UNESCO. The province has among the highest concentration of castles in the world outside the Levant, thanks to its strategic position during the Reconquista.

The annual chess tournament, held until 2010 in Linares, attracted many of the world's best players.

The province is the largest producer of olive oil in the world. It produces around 45% of all Spanish olive oil and 20% of the world's production. For this reason the province is also known as World Capital of Olive Oil. There are more than 66 million olive trees, spread over a surface of 550,000 hectares. The province alone produces more olive oil than the entire country of Italy. The province's production in 2013 was 749.387 tonnes of olive oil.

Symbols

Flag 
The flag of the province of Jaén was approved by the Provincial Council of Jaén, in the plenary session held on March 3, 2014 and registered in the Andalusian Registry of Local Entities, complying with Law 6/2003, of October 9 of Symbols, Processing and Registration of Andalusian Local Entities.

The flag is arranged in a rectangular cloth with a proportion of 1/1.5, being longer than it is wide. It has an area of 10x15 sectors, with the shield being three sectors high and eight sectors wide; and occupying six sectors high and five sectors wide. The flag is green pantone color 377, in reference to the natural heritage of the province.

Population
The historical population is given in the following chart:

See also 
 List of municipalities in Jaén

References

External links 

  Despeñaperros Natural Park
  Sierra de Andújar Natural Park
  Sierra Mágina Natural Park
  Sierras de Cazorla, Segura y Las Villas Natural Park
 Cazorla, Segura y Las Villas
 Photo album from La Iruela Castle - Jaén - Andalusia